Sub-Lieutenant Ronald David Scott (born 17 October 1917) is an Argentine Naval aviator who flew for the Royal Navy’s Fleet Air Arm in the Second World War.

He was featured in the short film Buena Onda: The Tale of Ronny Scott in 2021.

Career
I was born in Villa Devoto, certainly, but what else could I do but go to war? When someone like Hitler kills the number of people he ended up massacring, I think something has to be done. That's what I felt. Beyond coming from a family of British origin, I felt it was my obligation as a human being.

Son of a veteran soldier from Scotland and a nurse from England, in 1942 at the age of 25, Scott signed up to the Royal Navy at the British Embassy in Buenos Aires, where he fought as a volunteer until the end of the Second World War, where he was awarded the 1939-1945 Star.

Later life
Scott later returned to Argentina where he flew as a commercial pilot for Aeroposta Argentina, flying Douglas DC-3 aircraft to Patagonia. When Aeroposta merged with Aerolíneas Argentinas, he continued to fly, captaining a Douglas DC4, a Comet 4 before culminating his career flying the Boeing 747. He retired with over 23000 flight hours under his belt.

He now lives in the Buenos Aires suburb of San Isidro, as the last surviving Spitfire pilot in Latin America. In 2021 he was made a life member of the Fleet Air Arm Officer's Association by Vice-Admiral Sir Adrian Johns, the former Second Sea Lord.

References

Fleet Air Arm aviators
Fleet Air Arm personnel of World War II
Military personnel from Buenos Aires
1917 births
Living people
Argentine people of English descent
Argentine people of Scottish descent
Royal Navy officers

es:Ronald Scott